Imepitoin, sold under the brand name Pexion, is an anticonvulsant which is used in veterinary medicine in Europe to treat epilepsy in dogs. It was recently approved in the United States. The drug also has anxiolytic effects. It was originally developed to treat epilepsy in humans, but clinical trials were terminated upon findings of unfavorable metabolic differences in smokers and non-smokers.

Imepitoin acts as a low-affinity (4,350–5,140 nM; relative to Ki = 6.8 nM for diazepam and Ki = 1.7 nM for clonazepam) partial agonist of the benzodiazepine site of the GABAA receptor (up to 12–21% of the maximal potentiation of diazepam, a full agonist of this site). It is the first partial agonist to be approved for the treatment of epilepsy. The drug also dose-dependently blocks voltage-gated calcium channels. It is not a benzodiazepine; instead, it is an imidazolone, and bears some structural similarities to hydantoin anticonvulsants like ethotoin and phenytoin.

See also
 Separation anxiety in dogs § Benzodiazepine treatment

References

Anticonvulsants
Anxiolytics
Calcium channel blockers
Chloroarenes
GABAA receptor positive allosteric modulators
4-Morpholinyl compunds
Veterinary drugs